Seth R.J.J. High School is one of the oldest schools in Navsari, India. It was founded in 1846 by Sir Jamsetjee Jeejebhoy, an Indian merchant and philanthropist.

External links
Education Department, Gujarat State

High schools and secondary schools in Gujarat
Educational institutions established in 1846
Education in Navsari district
1846 establishments in British India